Love's Old Sweet Song is a 1923 American two-reel short film made in the De Forest Phonofilm sound-on-film process. The film was directed by J. Searle Dawley and stars Louis Wolheim, Donald Gallaher, Ernest Hilliard, and Una Merkel in her film debut.

Cast
 Louis Wolheim as The Wanderer
 Helen Weir as Eunice
 Donald Gallaher as Charlie
 Ernest Hilliard as Mother
 Baby Margaret Brown as Babs
 Ernest Hilliard as Power
 Una Merkel

Production
This was one of the few two-reel films produced by Lee de Forest in Phonofilm due to problems with changeovers when the film was projected in theaters. In June 1923, de Forest and the film's cinematographer Freeman Harrison Owens became embroiled in a legal battle over the Phonofilm process and patents.

See also
Phonofilm
Sound film
Abraham Lincoln (1924 film short), another two-reel Phonofilm

References

External links
 
 Progressive Silent Film List: Love's Old Sweet Song at silentera.com

1923 films
Films directed by J. Searle Dawley
American silent short films
1923 short films
Phonofilm short films
American black-and-white films
Early sound films
1920s American films
1920s English-language films